This is a list of digital television service providers in Uganda.

Pay TV operators
These were the eight pay television operating companies in Uganda, including mode of transmission and area of coverage, as of January 2019.

At that time, there were 2.2 million pay-television customers in the country, according to the Uganda Communications Commission.

See also
 List of companies based in Uganda

References

External links
 Website of Uganda Communications Commission

Satellite television
Satellite
Satellite
Television in Uganda